Joseph Hood may refer to:

Sir Joseph Hood, 1st Baronet (1863–1931), British businessman and Conservative Party politician
Joseph Martin Hood (born 1942), United States federal judge
Joseph Douglas Hood, American entomologist
Joseph Henry Hood (1846–1922), Australian judge

See also
Joey Hood (born 1976), American politician and member of the Mississippi House of Representatives
Joey R. Hood, American diplomat